Auriol Sally Dongmo Mekemnang (born 3 August 1990) is a Cameroon-born Portuguese track and field athlete who competes in the shot put and discus throw. She represented Cameroon at the 2016 Summer Olympics and the World Athletics Championships in 2015. At continental level, she was a two-time gold medalist at both the African Games and the African Championships in Athletics. 

This is a Cameroonian record outdoors and an African record indoors. Her best in the discus is a more modest .

She represented her native Cameroon until 2017, transferring her eligibility to Portugal which became active in 2020.

Competition record

National titles
Portuguese Outdoor Women's Athletics Championship
Shot put: 2019
Portuguese Indoor Women's Athletics Championship
Shot put: 2019

See also
List of African Games medalists in athletics (women)
Cameroon at the 2016 Summer Olympics
Cameroon at the 2015 World Championships in Athletics

References

External links
 

1990 births
Living people
People from Ngaoundéré
Cameroonian female shot putters
Portuguese female shot putters
Cameroonian female discus throwers
Portuguese female discus throwers
Olympic athletes of Cameroon
Olympic athletes of Portugal
Athletes (track and field) at the 2016 Summer Olympics
Athletes (track and field) at the 2014 Commonwealth Games
African Games medalists in athletics (track and field)
African Games gold medalists for Cameroon
Athletes (track and field) at the 2011 All-Africa Games
Athletes (track and field) at the 2015 African Games
World Athletics Championships athletes for Cameroon
Cameroonian emigrants to Portugal
Portuguese people of Cameroonian descent
European Athletics Indoor Championships winners
Athletes (track and field) at the 2020 Summer Olympics
World Athletics Indoor Championships winners
European Athletics Championships medalists
World Athletics Championships athletes for Portugal